Grigori Grigoryevich Bogemsky (born 1895 in Odessa; died 1957 in Prague) was a Russian football player.

Honors
 Russian League winner: 1913

International career
Bogemsky played his only game for Russia on 14 September 1913 in a friendly against Norway.

Sources

External links
 Profile 

1895 births
1957 deaths
Russian footballers
Russia international footballers
FK Viktoria Žižkov players
Footballers from Odesa
White Russian emigrants to Czechoslovakia
Association football forwards